Andrés Eliseo Chávez (born 21 March 1991) is an Argentine professional footballer who plays as a forward.

Club career

Boca Juniors
Chávez scored his second and third goal in Boca Juniors against Rosario Central for the Copa Sudamericana on 18 September, the match ended 3–0. On 4 November 2015, Chávez scored the second goal in the 2015 Copa Argentina Final helping Boca defeat Rosario Central 2–0, and secure their domestic double.

São Paulo
Chávez made his first goal for São Paulo FC in his second match for new club, against Atlético Mineiro, on 4 August 2016. He scored twice in the São Paulo victory for 2–1 against Santa Cruz, 7 August .

Panathinaikos
On August 14, 2017, Greek Super League club Panathinaikos completed the deal for the Boca Juniors striker. The Greens have agreed with Boca Juniors for the transfer of Chavez, with a fee of €1.3 million for the 50% of his rights, the player agreed to a three years' contract. The deal could rise up to €2.6 million if the Greek club decides to purchase the remaining 50% of his rights within the next 3 years.
The most expensive of all 2016–17 season signings, the Argentine striker arrived with the most fanfare but ultimately failed enormously to the point where his transfer is the biggest miss. Bought to replace the ever-reliable Marcus Berg, the former Boca Juniors winger made an instant impact by scoring in his debut. On 20 August 2017 he made his debut for the club, which was combined with his first goal in 1–1 away draw against Platanias. This however, proved to be a false dawn as injury and poor attitude got in the way. He also scored in a Greek Cup match against Larissa F.C.

It was questioned in the beginning whether he even wanted to transfer to Greece, and on 23 September 2017, Chavez suffered a hamstring injury which will keep him on the sidelines for several weeks. Chavez picked up a hamstring injury in the 2–0 defeat from Panetolikos F.C. This is another serious blow at Panathinaikos as the Greens are running a dreadful form in the Greek Super League with only three points out of five games. Due to his unprofessional attitude Chavez was released by the greens on 14 December 2017. The reason behind this was that Chavez flew to Argentina and never returned. With the concern raised in Panathinaikos about the debt to Boca Juniors and the refusal of the player to continue in the Greek Super League the information from Argentina that Estudiantes are interested in the player to cover part of Panathinaikos's debt even with me the form of loan for the rest of the season, will be an important help for the struggling financially Greens.

Huracán
On 16 January 2018, Chavez signed a contract with Huracán returning to his country. After his passage through Panathinaikos, the forward returns to Argentina "I am very happy to return to my country," he said in a dialogue with Tyc Sports. The transfer, as reported, was in the range of €1.3 million, with Panathinaikos covered the debt that had since last summer with Boca Juniors and Banfield. Thus they weakened the annual budget of the club, together with the player's contract (€750,000 per year), which was the biggest one in the roster of the Greens.

Style of play

Chávez has a strong shot and a great presence in penalty area. His playing style has drawn comparisons to that of Jonathan Calleri, a former colleague of Chávez at Boca Juniors.

Honours
Boca Juniors
Argentine Primera División: 2015
Copa Argentina: 2014–15

External links

References

Living people
1991 births
Argentine footballers
Club Atlético Banfield footballers
Boca Juniors footballers
São Paulo FC players
Panathinaikos F.C. players
Club Atlético Huracán footballers
AEL Limassol players
Expatriate footballers in Brazil
Expatriate footballers in Cyprus
Campeonato Brasileiro Série A players
Argentine Primera División players
Primera Nacional players
Cypriot First Division players
Argentine expatriate footballers
Association football forwards
People from Salto Partido
Sportspeople from Buenos Aires Province